Articles related to Modern Egypt include:

0–9 

First dynasty of Egypt - 1st -through- 31st - Thirty-first dynasty of Egypt (From former page)

A 

Abaza Family - Abbas I of Egypt - Abbas II of Egypt - Abbasid - Pope Abraham of Alexandria - Abouna Matta El Meskeen - Abu Gorab - Abu Hafs al-Masri Brigades - Abukir - Abu Qir - Abu Qir Bay - Abu Simbel - Abusir - Abydos, Egypt - Abyssinian (cat) - Adze - Aegyptus - Africa - African Union - Akhenaten - Akhnaten (opera) - Al-Ahram - Al 'Arish - Al-Azhar University - Alexander the Great - Alexander Helios - Alexandria - Alexandrian text-type - Mohamed Al-Fayed - Al-Gama'a al-Islamiyya - Alhazen - Al-Hibah - Al-Qurn - Amarna - Amarna art - Amarna letters - Ambrose of Alexandria - Amr Diab - Amr Moussa - Anat - Ancient Egypt - Ancient Egyptian medicine - Ancient Near East - Ankh - Antony and Cleopatra - Anubis - Anwar Sadat - Arab League - Arabic language - Arsinoe, Egypt - Aswan - Aswan Dam - Asyut - Atenism - Athanasius of Alexandria - Avaris

B 

Ba - Badarian - Baggush Box - Sidi Barrani - Bas-relief - Battle of Actium - Battle of Alexandria (1801) - Battle of Kadesh - Battle of Megiddo (1918) - Battle of Navarino - Battle of the Nile - Bedouin - Beni Hasan - Bent Pyramid - "Bennu"->Phoenix (mythology) - Bibliotheca Alexandrina - Bintanath - James Henry Breasted - Brook of Egypt - Bubastis - Budasheer - List of burials in the Valley of the Kings

C 

Caesarion - Cairo - Gates of Cairo - Cairo Geniza - Cairo Metro - Cairo Tower - Camp David Accords (1978) - Canopic jar - Canopus, Egypt - Howard Carter - Cartouche - Cataracts of the Nile - Cave of Artemis - Youssef Chahine - Jean-François Champollion - Chariot - Children of Gebelawi - Cinema of Egypt - Cleitarchus - Clement of Alexandria - Cleopatra - Cleopatra (1934 film) - Cleopatra (1963 film) - Cleopatra (1999 film) - Codex Sinaiticus - Coffin Texts - Colossi of Memnon - Communications in Egypt - Constantin-François de Chassebœuf, Comte de Volney - Conventional Egyptian chronology - Coptic alphabet,"script" - Coptic Orthodox Church - Coptic language - Corniche - Corvée - Culture of Egypt - Cusae - Cyrenaica - Cyril of Alexandria

D 

DB320 - Dahshur - François-Paul Brueys D'Aigalliers - Dakhla Oasis - Dalida - Damnatio memoriae - Darius the Great's Suez Inscriptions - Dedun - Deir el-Medina - Deir el-Bahri - Demographics of Egypt - Demotic - Demotist - Divine Adoratrice of Amun - Dodi Al-Fayed - Bernardino Drovetti

E 

Early Dynastic Period of Egypt - Eastern Berber languages - Georg Ebers - Ebers papyrus - Economy of Egypt - Edfu - Edwin Smith papyrus - Egypt - Egypt–Israel peace treaty - The Egyptian - Egyptian calendar - Egyptian Campaign - Egyptian chronology - Egyptian Civil Code - Egyptian hieroglyph - Egyptian Islamic Jihad - Egyptian language - Egyptian languages - Egyptian mathematics - Egyptian Museum - Egyptian mythology - Egyptian pyramids - Egyptians - Egyptian Sand Sea - Egyptian soul - Egyptologist - Egyptology - Egypt under Muhammad Ali and his successors - Eileithyiaspolis - El Alamein - Mohamed ElBaradei - El-Lahun - El-Lisht - El-Mahalla El-Kubra - Elephantine - Elephantine papyri - Embalming - Ennead - Eratosthenes - Esna - Euclid - Exodus - Exodus Decoded

F 

Faience - Farouk of Egypt - Fatimid - Al Fayyum - Fayum - Fedayeen -  Bonner Fellers - First Battle of El Alamein -  First dynasty of Egypt - First Intermediate Period of Egypt - Fivefold Titulary - Foreign relations of Egypt - Fostat - Four sons of Horus - Fuad I of Egypt - Fuad II of Egypt

G 

Gama'at Islamiya - Gamal Abdel Nasser - Gates of Cairo - Geography of Egypt - George Syncellus - Gerzeh - Giza - Giza pyramid complex - God's Wife of Amun - Governorates of Egypt - Great Hymn to the Aten - Great Pyramid of Giza - Great Sphinx of Giza

H 

Mamdouh Habib - (Queen) Hatshepsut of Egypt - Zahi Hawass - Heb Sed - Heliopolis (ancient and modern) - Herakleopolis Magna - "Heron"->Bennu->Phoenix (mythology) - Hierakonpolis - Hieratic,"script" - Egyptian hieroglyph - History of Egypt - 1 History of ancient Egypt - 2 Ptolemaic Egypt - 3 Aegyptus (Roman province) - 4 History of Egypt Under Achaemenid Persian Domination - 5 History of Arab Egypt - 6 History of Ottoman Egypt - 8 History of Modern Egypt - Suad Husni - Hyksos - Haytham Abbas

I 

Salima Ikram - Imhotep - Ipuwer papyrus - Irsu - Islamic Cairo

J 

Jebel Barkal or Gebel Barkal - Junit

K 

Karnak - Khafre's Pyramid - Kharga Oasis - Kohl - Kom Ombo - Temple of Kom Ombo - Umm Kulthum - Kush - KV (Egypt) - KV1 - KV3 - KV4 - KV5 - KV6 - KV9 - KV14 - KV17 - KV20 - KV34 - KV35 - KV39 - KV42 - KV43 - KV46 - KV55 - KV60 - KV62

L 

Lake Mareotis - Lake Nasser - Miles Lampson - Land of Goshen - Land of Punt - Late Period of Ancient Egypt - Leonardo da Vinci Art Institute - Karl Richard Lepsius - Levant - Library of Alexandria - Libyan Desert - List of Ancient Egyptian sites - List of cities in Egypt - List of Coptic Popes - List of Egyptians - List of Egyptian dynasties - List of Greek Orthodox Patriarchs of Alexandria - List of pharaohs - List of solar deities - Long Range Desert Group - " Lord Carnarvon " - "Blue" Lotus - "White" Lotus=Tiger Lotus - Luxor - Luxor Museum - Luxor Temple

M 

Naguib Mahfouz - Étienne-Louis Malus - Mameluks - Manetho -Auguste Mariette - Mark Antony - Mark the Evangelist - Marsa Matruh - Gaston Maspero - Mastaba - Matheos I of Alexandria - Medinet Habu (location) - Medinet Habu (temple) - Mediterranean Sea - Meidum - Memphis, Egypt - Mendes - Menkaure's Pyramid - Merneptah Stele - Mersa Matruh - Meshwesh - Milan Papyrus - Military history of Egypt during World War II - Military of Egypt - Mizraim - Mnewer"Mnevis" - Muhammad Abdul Moneim - Mortuary Temple of Amenhotep III -  Moses - Mount Sinai - Gamal Mubarak - Hosni Mubarak - Muhammad Ahmad -  Mummy - Mummification Museum - Egyptian Museum - Museum of Islamic Ceramics - Luxor Museum - Muslim Brotherhood

N 

Nabta Playa - Nag Hammadi - Nag Hammadi library - Muhammad Naguib - Mustafa an-Nahhas Pasha - Napata - Naqada - Gamal Abdel Nasser - Necropolis - Nile - Nile crocodile - Nile Delta - Nile Perch - Nile Quay Texts - Nilo-Saharan languages - Nilometer - Nomarch - Nome (Egypt) - Nubia - Nubian languages - Nymphaea ="Lotus" - "Egyptian Blue 'Lotus'"=Nymphaea caerulea - "Egyptian White" = Tiger Lotus= Nymphaea lotus

O 

Obelisk - Richard O'Connor - Operation Compass - Origen - Ostracon - Oxyrhynchus - Oxyrhynchus Gospels - Ozymandias

P 

Pachomius - Palestine (region) - Papyrus - Papyrus Harris I - Papyrus of Ani - Papyrus P52 - Passage of Red Sea - Pelusium - Patriarch Peter of Alexandria (disambiguation) - Pope Peter of Alexandria (disambiguation) - William Matthew Flinders Petrie - Pharaoh - Philae - Politics of Egypt - Polybus of Thebes - Port Said - Precinct of Amon-Re - Precinct of Mut - Princess Fawzia Fuad of Egypt - Ptolemaic Egypt - Decree of Canopus - Decree of Memphis (Ptolemy IV) - Rosetta Stone - Land of Punt - Pylon (architecture) - Pyramid - Bent Pyramid - Egyptian pyramids - Khafre's Pyramid - Menkaure's Pyramid - Red Pyramid - Step pyramid - Pyramid of Djoser - Pyramid of Unas - Pyramid Texts - Pyramidion - Pyramidology

Q 

Qattara Depression - Qetesh - Qubbet el-Hawa - Queen Ahmose - Queen consort - Valley of the Queens - QV44 - QV66

R 

Ra - Rahab - Ramesseum - Red Pyramid - Red Sea - Reformed Egyptian - Rhind Mathematical Papyrus - Rhinocolura - David Rohl - Erwin Rommel - Rosetta - Rosetta Stone - Rosicrucian Egyptian Museum - Royal Wadi and tombs - Rylands Library Papyrus P52

S 

Anwar Sadat - Sahara Desert - Saint Catherine's Monastery - Sais, Egypt - Salec - Abdel-Razzak Al-Sanhuri - Sarcophagus - Satis - Scarabaeus sacer - Scaraboid seal - Scribe - Second Battle of El Alamein - Sehel Island - Senet - Serabit el-Khadim - Serapeum - Shabti - Ushabti - Shai - Shardana - Omar Sharif - Sharm el-Sheikh - Shasu - Shenouda III of Alexandria - Sinai Peninsula - Sistrum - Siwa Oasis - Siwi language - Six-Day War - Sobek - Southern Tomb 25 - Cave of Artemis/"Speos Artemidos" - Sphinx - Stargate - Stela - Stella (beer) - Step pyramid - The Story of Sinuhe - Story of Wenamun - Suez - Suez Canal - Suez Crisis - Syenite - Syriac

T 

TT71 - Taba (Egypt) - Talatat - Tanis, Egypt - Temple of Kom Ombo - Tewfik Pasha - Mohammed Ali Tewfik - The Egyptian - The Ten Commandments (1956 movie) - Theban Necropolis - Thebes, Egypt - Tiger Lotus (see Nymphaea's) - " Tombs of the Nobles " - Tombs of the Nobles (Amarna) - Transliteration of ancient Egyptian - Transportation in Egypt - TT71 - Tutankhamun and the Daughter of Ra

U 

Umm Kulthum - Umm el-Qa'ab - Uneg - United Arab Republic - Upper and Lower Egypt - Shabti - Ushabti - Uto/Buto

V 

Valley of the Kings - Valley of the Queens - Via della Vittoria

W 

Wady el-'Arish - Wagh el Birket - Kent R. Weeks - West Nile virus - Western Desert Force - Winter Palace Hotel, Luxor - Workmen's Village, Amarna - WV22 - WV23 - WV25

X 

Xerxes I of Persia - Xerxes II of Persia

Y 

Yom Kippur War - Thomas Young (scientist)

Z 

Ahmed H. Zewail - Zahi Hawass

See also 

 Index of Egypt-related articles
 Outline of Egypt

 
Egypt

ja:エジプト関係記事の一覧